Klara du Plessis is a South African-Canadian poet, who writes in both English and Afrikaans. Her debut poetry collection Ekke won the Pat Lowther Award, and was shortlisted for the Gerald Lampert Award, in 2019. Her second collection, Hell Light Flesh, was released in 2020.

Du Plessis was born in Montreal, but raised predominantly in Bloemfontein, South Africa. She is currently a graduate student at Montreal's Concordia University. Since 2018, she has been developing, Deep Curation, a practice of poetry reading organization that places poets' works in deliberate thematic and conceptual dialogue in performance.

References

21st-century Canadian poets
21st-century Canadian women writers
Canadian women poets
People from Bloemfontein
Writers from Montreal
South African emigrants to Canada
Living people
Year of birth missing (living people)